Ellia is a given name. Notable people with the name include:

Ellia English (born 1960), American singer and actress
Ellia Green (born 1993), Australian rugby union and rugby league footballer
Ellia Smeding (born 1998), British long track speed skater